McCalla is a census-designated place in Jefferson and Tuscaloosa counties, Alabama, United States, southwest of Bessemer and the geographic terminus of the Appalachian Mountains.

The community is named for Richard Calvin McCalla, a well known civil engineer, who served as chief engineer of several railroads throughout the South, including the Alabama and Chattanooga, the Tuscaloosa and Northern and the Knoxville and Ohio. He also served as surveyor of many of the rivers throughout the South.

Demographics

2020 census

As of the 2020 United States census, there were 12,965 people residing in the CDP. Information on households and families is unavailable at the moment, but the totals will be added once those figures are released for McCalla.

Recreation 

Tannehill State Park features a 19th-century blast furnace, the Iron and Steel Museum of Alabama, various historical buildings, rustic cabins, and a campground. The park also has a slave cemetery. The park is home to several festivals throughout the year, including the Southern Appalachian Dulcimer Festival, the Down Home Psaltery Festival, archery tournaments, a civil war reenactment, and other events.

Schools 
The McCalla area is served by McAdory Elementary,McCalla Elementary,  McAdory Middle,  and McAdory High School .

Notable people
Chad Smith Major League pitcher for the Colorado Rockies
 Morris Higginbotham, head football coach for several high schools in the Birmingham area. 
 Bo Jackson was raised in Martin Town, and went through the McAdory school system where he set state records in multiple sports. He is an American former professional  baseball and football player and is the only athlete to be named an All-Star in two major American sports.
 Sherri Martel, known as Sensational Sherri, was a professional wrestling valet who died in McCalla

References

Census-designated places in Alabama
Census-designated places in Jefferson County, Alabama
U.S. Route 11